The 1954 Central Michigan Chippewas football team represented Central Michigan College of Education, renamed Central Michigan University in 1959, in the Interstate Intercollegiate Athletic Conference (IIAC) during the 1954 college football season. In their fourth season under head coach Kenneth Kelly, the Chippewas compiled an 8–2 record (5–1 against IIAC opponents), tied for the IIAC championship, and outscored all opponents by a combined total of 321 to 107.

The team's statistical leaders included Jim King with 399 passing yards, Jim Podoley with 1,079 rushing yards, and Jerry Thomas with 121 receiving yards. Center Dick Kackmeister received the team's most valuable player award. Four Central Michigan players (Podoley, Kackmeister, guard Ray Figg, and halfback LaVerne Wolf) received first-team honors on the All-IIAC team.

Schedule

References

Central Michigan
Central Michigan Chippewas football seasons
Interstate Intercollegiate Athletic Conference football champion seasons
Central Michigan Chippewas football